A political scandal took place in Canada in 2020 regarding the awarding of a federal contract to WE Charity to administer the $912 million Canada Student Summer Grant program (CSSG). The controversy arose when it was revealed that the WE charity had previously paid close family of Prime Minister Justin Trudeau to appear at its events, despite making claims to the contrary. In total, Craig Kielburger confirmed at a parliamentary committee, WE Charity paid approximately $425,000 to Trudeau's family including expenses. WE Charity also used pictures of Trudeau's family members as celebrity endorsements in their application. Trudeau stated that WE Charity had been uniquely capable of administering the program as "the only possible option", and that it was the civil service, not him, who decided that WE Charity was the best option. It was noted that not only had the charity employed a daughter of former Finance Minister Bill Morneau but a close relationship existed between the minister and members of its staff.

Other organizations, such as the Public Service Alliance of Canada and YMCA Canada, expressed skepticism at the claim that WE Charity was the only organization in Canada capable of administering the contract. Evidence discovered by parliamentary committees investigating the scandal suggested a significant degree of preferential treatment given to WE Charity by the civil service, as, while WE Charity was allowed to repeatedly revise its proposals for the program (a common occurrence in sole-source contracts), no call for proposals was ever issued, nor were any received from any other organization. Reports also indicated that this was further amplified by pressure from Morneau to make the selection.

Ethics Commissioner Mario Dion's report on the involvement of Trudeau, entitled The Trudeau III Report, confirmed his  assertion that Canada's civil service had recommended WE Charity to manage the Canada Student Service Grant program. Dion found that on 22 May 2020 Trudeau agreed to their recommendation following a briefing on the previous day in which they conveyed their determination that WE was the only existing organization capable of managing the nationwide program upon short notice. The report exonerated Trudeau in the scandal, commenting: "In light of the evidence gathered in this examination and for the reasons outlined above, I find that Mr. Trudeau did not contravene subsection 6(1), section 7 or section 21 of the Act." He added: "In my view, the creation and eventual ratification of the (Canada Student Services Grant) was not done improperly."

In his final report entitled The Morneau II Report, Dion ruled that Morneau had contravened sections 6(1), 7, and 21 of the Federal Conflict of Interest Act. In the ruling, Dion stated: "The examination found the relationship between Mr. Morneau and WE included an unusually high degree of involvement between their representatives and afforded WE unfettered access to the Office of the Minister of Finance, which amounted to preferential treatment." Dion also ruled that this preferential treatment was a result of the close friendship between Bill Morneau and members of WE Charity. Dion added that "this unfettered access to the Office of the Minister of Finance was based on the identity of WE’s representative, Mr. Craig Kielburger", who was both a constituent and close friend of Bill Morneau.

In a piece authored for the editorial board of The Cornwall Seeker, forensic accountant, professor and Founding President of the Canadian Academic Accounting Association L.S. Rosen examined allegations of impropriety surrounding the Canadian Student Service Grant program and determined them to be unfounded, writing that "several seemed launched to support attacks on other politicians" and that "WE became "collateral damage" in a battle for political power." Writing for Education Canada, Professors Karen Mundy of the Ontario Institute for Studies in Education and Kelly Gallagher-Mackay of Wilfrid Laurier University lamented that, amidst a crisis in Canadian education, WE Charity was prevented from fulfilling its commission, with thousands of youth volunteer tutors sidelined due to the appearance of scandal. Rosen summarized, "A generation of young people lost the opportunity to volunteer and help their country in a time of need."

On September 20, 2021, having been cleared of wrongdoing, Trudeau led the Liberal Party to reelection in the 2021 Canadian federal election.

Early events 
On April 5, 2020 amidst the COVID-19 Pandemic, the Prime Minister of Canada, Justin Trudeau, and his then-Finance Minister Bill Morneau, held a telephone conversation discussing measures to financially assist the country's student population. The Finance Department was tasked with devising a series of measures to address these issues. This would begin a chain of events involving numerous governmental agencies.

Through a no-bid selection process, WE Charity was chosen to administer the CSSG, which would have created grants for students who volunteered during the COVID-19 pandemic. The contract agreement was signed with WE Charity Foundation, a corporation affiliated with WE Charity, on June 23, 2020. It was agreed that WE Charity, which had already begun incurring eligible expenses for the project on May 5 at their own risk, would be paid $43.53 million to administer the program; $30 million of which was paid to WE Charity Foundation on June 30, 2020. This was later fully refunded. A senior bureaucrat would note that "ESDC thinks that 'WE' might be able to be the volunteer matching third party ... The mission of WE is congruent with national service and they have a massive following on social media."

Concurrent to these events, and prior to the announcement of the CSSG on June 25, 2020, WE Charity was simultaneously corresponding with the same government agencies ultimately  responsible for choosing the administrator of the program. WE Charity would submit numerous proposals in April, beginning on April 9, 2020, on the topic of youth volunteer award programs. These were able to be reformed into what became the CSSG.

Announcement and reactions 
On June 25, 2020 Justin Trudeau announced a series of relief measures for students. Among them was the Canada Student Service Grant program; whereby students would be eligible to receive $1000 for every 100 hours of volunteer activities, up to $5,000.

The structure of the program, and the selection of WE Charity as its administrator, immediately triggered condemnation amongst the Official Opposition, as well as numerous other groups, such as the Public Service Alliance of Canada, Democracy Watch, and Volunteer Canada who argued that WE Charity:
 Was not the only possible administrator as had been claimed
 Had been the beneficiary of cronyism
 Had experienced significant disruption due to the COVID-19 pandemic and required a bailout
 Had illegally lobbied the government
 Was unable to operate in French-speaking regions of Canada
 Was potentially in violation of labour laws
 Had created hundreds of volunteer positions with WE Charity itself as part of the program, doing work generally conducted by paid employees, representing a conflict of interests.

WE Charity as the only possible option 

The government insisted that, of all the third-party organizations in Canada, WE Charity had been identified as the "only possible option" capable of undertaking the program. On June 29, 2020, Justin Trudeau said that "as the Public Service dug into it, they came back with only one organization that was capable of networking, and organizing, and delivering this program on the scale that we needed it, and that was the WE program." This claim was refuted by the Public Service Alliance of Canada, a union representing government employees, who said in a written statement: "Finally—and let me conclude—if the government had either used existing programs or asked the public service to set up a new student work and payment plan, it would have avoided the conflict of interest issues that have come to light since the WE Charity announcement, and it would have been able to deliver both pay and work experience to students."

Rachel Wernick, a key figure in the process, stated that WE Charity was the only organization to submit a proposal for the CSSG, although no call for proposals was ever issued; nor were any received from any other organization. These same government employees indicated that other major organizations such as YMCA Canada and United Way had been considered, but at no point did the government contact these agencies. This was despite the fact that the government had been in contact and collaboration with WE Charity regarding the program for at least a month prior. In a statement directly challenging the assertion that WE Charity was the only charity in Canada capable of administering the program, Peter Dinsdale, president and CEO of YMCA Canada, told CTV News in an interview: "At no point did the government contact YMCA Canada about delivering that program." He added that his organization "absolutely" would have been capable of administering the program. Dinsdale however noted that "It would have been tough given the state of YMCAs across the country, given the impact of COVID — really fighting for basic survival," continuing, "In normal times, (this) 100 per cent would have been something we could have done."

Claims of cronyism 
New claims and questions about cronyism surfaced on February 26, 2021 in front of a House of Commons Ethics Committee.  Committee MP's questioned a former WE Charity employee asking if the $41,000 in unpaid vacation fees that former Finance Minister Bill Morneau owed to WE Charity could have been perceived as a bribe for the multimillion-dollar tax payer grant he later provided to WE Charity.

Questions were raised as to whether WE Charity had enjoyed a privileged level of communication with high ranking government employees as a result of its association with prominent individuals. The initial impetus which led to the formation of the CSSG stemmed directly from a conversation between Justin Trudeau and Bill Morneau; both of whom also formally apologized for not recusing themselves from the decision-making process on July 13, 2020.

Initially, WE Charity and Trudeau insisted that the charity had never paid members of Trudeau's family to appear at events. This was later proven to be a fabrication as on July 9, 2020, it was discovered both the mother and brother of Justin Trudeau had been directly paid tens of thousands of dollars by WE Charity Social Enterprises, a company affiliated with WE Charity, through a third-party speaking agency. Furthermore, Sophie-Gregoire Trudeau was found to have significant food and travel expenditures paid for on behalf of the charity while working for it in an unpaid volunteer position. This was significant as it was claimed the Prime Minister's Office had no involvement in the selection process, and that the selection of WE Charity had been undertaken in a non-partisan manner by the public service. This claim, that there was no involvement from the PMO, was directly contradicted by two April 20 inter-governmental emails regarding the CSSG. The first, sent on April 20, 2020, by assistant deputy finance minister Michelle Kovacevic, read in part: "There has been a lot of back and forth on a student package, as you well know and PMO has been weighing in on a version we shared with our Minister on Saturday." In addition to this, deputy minister of intergovernmental affairs and youth Christiane Fox stated: "I understand WE has been in touch with some of you (or your teams) on a proposal they have for social innovation, picking up from discussions they had with us pre-Covid. I am told they met with Ministers NG, Chagger and others to discuss this + a revised version of the service program. They reached out today as they are also working with DPMO and PMO." Finally, the charity's revised proposal for administering the grant program, which was ultimately accepted by the government for the CSSG, included photos of the organization's "celebrity ambassadors" — among them, the prime minister's mother and wife.

Bill Morneau and his family were also found to have accepted travel expenditures paid for on behalf of WE Charity, some of which was retroactively reimbursed by Morneau over the course of the scandal. Additionally, one of Morneau's daughters was found to be directly employed by the charity; while another daughter spoke at multiple WE Charity events and was featured in WE's "Future 50" portrait series. During the events of the scandal, an internal-exchange between members of the Finance Department was disclosed wherein the personal relationship between Morneau and the Kielburgers was described as that of “besties”; furthermore, Morneau's office was found to be a key player in the decision to choose WE Charity.

Effects of COVID-19 on WE Charity 
Prior to the awarding of the contract, WE Charity had been facing difficulties along with the greater economy due to the effects of COVID-19. It was even more vulnerable, as a major component of its income was predicated on global travel, large gathering events such as WE Day, and tourism experiences. Consequently, it had undergone significant layoffs in the period prior to the inception of the CSSG.

Many of these personnel were able to be rehired as a result of the awarding of the program. This was referred to by Charlie Angus, the NDP Shadow Critic, as a bailout for friends of the Liberal Party. In March 2020, a significant proportion of the board of directors at WE Charity had been abruptly replaced. WE Charity stated that this had been typical conduct, as the contracts had expired naturally, but it was later revealed that the positions were slated to end on August 31, 2020, not March 2020.

WE Charity has repeatedly asserted it was in no financial distress prior to, or during the scandal. This claim is challenged by the fact that on July 12, 2020, it laid off hundreds of staff, followed by the sale of its Canadian real-estate and more layoffs in August, before eventually closing all of its Canadian operations by September.

Writing for the Cornwall Seeker, forensic accountant L.S. Rosen refuted the notion that the Student Grant program amounted to a public "bail-out" of WE Charity, finding preexisting assets sufficient to support WE’s continuing operations while the structure of the program did not allow the possibility of any net gains.

Lobbying activities 
WE Charity was not a registered lobby group at the time of the events, but it retroactively registered as a lobby group on August 13, 2020, with 18 individuals registered to lobby 19 governmental departments. In response to allegations of illegal lobbying activities, WE Charity's Executive Director Dalal Al-Waheidi stated that WE Charity had only spent about one to three per cent of its overall "budget and engagement" on communicating with government and noted the lobbying act only requires organizations which spend twenty percent or more of their budget on those activities to register.

Mark Blumberg, a lawyer with Blumberg Segal LLP, noted that given WE Charity's previous operating budget of $65 million in 2018, three percent of that would still be a considerable amount. Additionally, former Liberal Party National Director Jamie Carroll,  who had previously been indicted through the lobbying act, described it as a "sweetheart deal" as WE Charity was allowed to file its lobbying activities for the two previous years retroactively.

Administration in French-speaking Canada 
On May 29, 2020 WE Charity hired a third-party public relations firm, National, in order to administer the program in Quebec and French-speaking regions. National itself was in the process of identifying further community groups within Quebec, via Members of Parliament, prior to the cancellation of the CSSG. The amount paid by WE Charity to National was not disclosed by the charity. This challenged the assertion that WE Charity was the only organization capable of administering the program, as it could not operate on a nationwide basis without itself contracting a third party.

Allegations of labour law violations 
Concerns were raised regarding potential violations of provincial labour laws. The program was seen by some as potentially open to the exploitation of a vulnerable demographic, in a scarce job market, by compensating them at a lower rate than legally mandated in any province. The lowest allowed minimum wage in Canada varies between provinces ranging from $11–$15/hour, the CSSG would have compensated students at $10/hour. While the program stipulated that volunteers should not be used by an organization to replace paid employees, job titles like "translator", "digital designer", and "content creator" were among the generally paid positions being offered through the program.

Conflict of interest 
Prior to the awarding of the contract WE Charity had been experiencing layoffs. Having students conduct WE Charity work at a reduced wage in the form of volunteerism which was previously conducted by paid employees was seen as a potential conflict of interest, as WE Charity would be both a beneficiary and distributor of the award money. Additional concerns regarding a conflict of interest were raised, as hundreds of the volunteer opportunities created by the CSSG were with WE Charity itself, conducting work for the charity.

Investigation, resignation, and prorogation 
In addition to the Ethics Committee, a further two governmental committees would be established to investigate the scandal: on Finance and Government Operations. These would continue to run from their inception until August 18, when the government was prorogued, ending all sitting committees. Numerous individuals would be called to testify including the Kielburgers, the Prime Minister, Members of Parliament and public servants. From these committee there would be a number of important outcomes. One major piece of evidence that was uncovered through committee investigation was the revelation, on July 9, that WE Charity had directly paid members of the Prime Minister's family. This was not disclosed by either party, who had in fact stated that the family had not been paid, and had to be discovered as a result of parliamentary investigation.

During testimony on July 22, 2020, Bill Morneau revealed that he had undisclosed travel expenditures from years prior, paid for by WE Charity. Morneau apologized and explained to the committee that he had forgotten about the costs, and had repaid  $41,366 that same day. This would haunt Morneau throughout the scandal, as the forgetting of the payment was seen as incongruent to his role as Finance Minister, and the ability to write a cheque for that amount, when many Canadians were applying for COVID-19 benefits in the form of a $2000 monthly emergency payment, was seen as out of touch. In his testimony to the Standing Committee on Finance on July 28, 2018, Marc Kielburger said: "Sir, yes, we're happy to provide that information in terms of especially the reimbursement of travel expenses that was specifically requested."

Another consequence of these committee investigations was the eventual release of a massive quantity of data pertaining to the scandal on August 18, 2020. Included were personal correspondence and inter-governmental memos written by the individuals responsible for the no-bid selection process. Contained within this file were significant disclosures, such as the awareness of the “bestie” relationship which existed between Morneau and the Kielburgers. Moreover, these files strongly suggested that the public service had been pressured by political forces to select WE Charity and that there had been a significant amount of governmental collaboration with WE Charity prior to the creation of the program. A significant portion of the documents had experienced severe redactions however, rendering much of the information incomprehensible. It was later found that these redactions had been done in an inappropriate manner, by individuals who were not authorized to make them.

On August 17, 2020, Bill Morneau announced his resignation as the Finance Minister. The stated reason for his resignation was that it was the right time for a new Finance Minister in light of the evolving pandemic. Many however, saw the timing as related to the ongoing investigations into the WE Scandal and increasing pressure by opposition members for his resignation.

On August 18, 2020, Justin Trudeau officially prorogued parliament. This disbanded all the sitting committees investigating the WE Charity Scandal. This was condemned by the opposition as a tactic to avoid scrutiny, if not an outright coverup as the timing of the prorogation occurred on the same day as the release of the previously mentioned, redacted, 5000-page dossier. Although a significant portion of the documents contained inappropriate levels of redaction, these were unable to be addressed due to the prorogation. In a 2015 campaign manifesto, Justin Trudeau promised to never make use of prorogation to avoid scrutiny; he had repeatedly castigated the practice of prorogation, even attending an anti-prorogation rally in 2010. The prorogation had an additional consequence in that WE Charity, which had explicitly promised to release their side of the documents relating to the scandal weeks earlier in July, then refused to release them, as there were no standing committees to submit them to; WE Charity went on to label attempts to acquire this information as "politicking".
Supporters of the prorogation suggested the scandal had no impact on the decision, and pointed to the ongoing COVID-19 crisis as necessitating a cessation in parliamentary debate while the government reset its policy in light of the unprecedented events.

Events post-prorogation 
On September 23, 2020 the second session of the 43rd  parliament was officially opened with a Speech from the Throne by Governor General Julie Payette.

Efforts to re-establish the investigations tasked with examining the scandal were repeatedly blocked by the Liberal Party through the use of parliamentary procedure and filibuster; this would continue into November.

Stillman Foundation reports 
On October 29, 2020 two reports on WE Charity were published. These reports were funded by the Stillman Foundation, a Minnesota-based US organization which has longstanding ties to WE Charity.

The first report by Matt Torigian, former Deputy Solicitor General for the province of Ontario, concluded there had been no ethical or legal violations in the awarding of the contract; Torigian would go on to broadcast these findings in an opinion column of the Toronto Star. The second report, a forensic audit by accountant Al Rosen, found WE Charity had been in excellent financial health prior to the events of the scandal.

The Toronto Star would issue an editorial on November 6, 2020 apologizing to its readers noting "The Star's failing here was not making clear to readers who was behind the reports." The report was initially branded an independent inquiry; the fact that a major sponsor of WE Charity had commissioned it was omitted entirely. "We fully realized the problem and wanted to correct it precisely because of transparency," said Andrew Phillips, the editorial page editor.

Testimony to Canada's House of Commons Ethics Committee on February 26, 2021 led NDP Member of Parliament, Charlie Angus, to raise concerns as to why the Stillman Foundation would take out expensive full-page ads in major Canadian newspapers and conduct an extensive online campaign  to promote the innocence of WE Charity while they are so closely linked to WE Charity's board of directors.

Reed Cowan Testimony 
On Friday February 26, 2021 the House of Commons Ethics Committee heard new testimony from a former WE Charity donor, Reed Cowan, saying that WE Charity had removed a plaque honoring his deceased child. Video evidence showed that a new plaque had been put up to replace the plaque that carried the legacy of Wesley Cowan. WE Charity described this as a misunderstanding by Cowan, noting "WE's schoolhouses in Kenya are built to the same specifications and look similar to one another, so we understand Mr. Cowan’s confusion." The charity also noted after Cowan brought the error to WE's attention, it had apologized and installed a second plaque in January 2021. Following Cowan's testimony the House Ethics Committee summoned the Kielburgers to appear the following Monday.

On March 1, 2021 WE Charity released a statement labelling the committee investigation as highly partisan. Furthermore, it declared that, as five of its employees had already been subject to committee testimony, it would not cooperate with any summons.

NDP Member of Parliament Charlie Angus would note that other executives from WE Charity such as Victor Li, the CFO, had also recently refused to voluntarily testify before the House Ethics Committee and had to be ordered to appear on February 19, 2021.

On March 8, 2021 the House Ethics Committee unanimously passed a motion ordering the Kielburgers to testify on, or before, March 12, 2021. A refusal would have seen the motion passed to the House of Commons where Members of Parliament would vote whether to make it a legally binding summons. Later on this day, the Kielburgers agreed to testify, on the condition that the date be pushed back to March 15, 2021 and that they have legal counsel present.

Findings 
In a detailed report released May 13, 2021, Ethics Commissioner Mario Dion ruled that WE Charity did not receive any preferential treatment from Prime Minister Justin Trudeau. Dion refuted the claim that WE Charity founders Craig and Marc Kielburger were friends with the Trudeau family, writing: "During the examination, I determined there was no friendship between Mr. Trudeau and the Kielburgers, nor was Mr. Trudeau involved in any discussions with them leading to the decisions." He also ruled that Trudeau's wife Sophie's volunteer work for WE Charity did not constitute a conflict of interest, and that none of Trudeau's relatives could have personally benefited from the government's contracts with WE Charity.

The Trudeau III Report 
The first report, entitled The Trudeau III Report, exonerated the Prime Minister of all charges. The report found that "the appearance of conflict is insufficient to cause a contravention of the Act's substantive rules." In this case, the Ethics Commissioner ruled that there was neither a close relationship, nor fiscally beneficial relationship between the Trudeau Family and WE Charity, nor was the Prime Minister "involved in any discussions with them leading to the decisions."

The Morneau II Report 
The second report, entitled The Morneau II Report, found the Finance Minister had broken three conflict of interest laws. In his ruling, the Ethics Commissioner stated that despite claims to the contrary, there existed a very close personal relationship between Bill Morneau and members of WE Charity. It was also ruled that Morneau "had the opportunity to improperly further WE's private interests", and in the final ruling Dion wrote: "I am of the view that Mr. Morneau gave WE preferential treatment by permitting his ministerial staff to disproportionately assist it when it sought federal funding. ... I therefore found that Mr. Morneau contravened subsection 6(1), section 7 and section 21 of the Act."

Timeline 
On April 5, 2020, Prime Minister Justin Trudeau and Former Finance Minister Bill Morneau were recorded in a telephone conversation discussing students, volunteer opportunities, and summer work programs within the context of the ongoing COVID-19 pandemic. The Finance Department was tasked with coming up with a number of options to address these issues.

On April 7, 2020, Small Business Minister Mary Ng and WE Charity Co-Founder Craig Kielburger had a telephone call in which WE Charity was asked to submit a pre-established proposal regarding a youth entrepreneurship program. The Finance Department contacted a number of organizations including WE Charity. The date given by the Finance Department for this call was April 7 while WE Charity stated it occurred on April 8. The number of organizations contacted is unknown as it was later discovered that a number of organizations which had been listed as having been contacted, such as the YMCA, were never contacted and "most were never told" about the program.

On April 9, 2020, WE Charity sent an unsolicited proposal to the Government of Canada, specifically the offices of Youth Minister Bardish Chagger and Mary Ng, regarding a program that would seek to award youth monetary grants for the purpose of entrepreneurship. WE Charity has repeatedly stressed that this unsolicited exchange was "distinct and clearly unrelated" to the later proposals.

On April 17, 2020, Chagger spoke with WE co-founder Craig Kielburger to discuss a second proposal by the group to create a youth social entrepreneurship program. Kielburger later sent an email to Chagger thanking her for considering this proposal on April 22, 2020. While it was initially stated that this second proposal was rejected by the government, documents released over the course of the scandal indicated that this proposal was instead repeatedly revised. There was a significant amount of communication between WE Charity and government officials from this date on in order to adapt WE Charity's proposal to ensure it best fit the "ministry's mandate". (See August 13, and August 18)

On April 18, 2020 the Finance Department discussed involving a third-party to administer the program. According to Morneau, "it was the first time he was involved in any talk about WE and the grant program."

On April 19, 2020, Rachel Wernick, a senior government official with Employment and Social Development Canada, made a phone call to Craig Kielburger to discuss youth programs and request a proposal as per his conversation with Chagger on April 17, 2020. During this exchange, the earlier April 9 proposal was raised and it was agreed that it, as well as a second proposal, would be forwarded to the government.

On April 20, 2020 officials in the Finance Department spoke with representatives from WE Charity to discuss a volunteer program. Notes provided by the minister's office said WE Charity would "rework" its proposal to the government to "fully meet the policy objective of national service." On the same day, WE Charity submitted a proposal to the privy council.

Also on April 20, as a result of retroactive disclosures related to the release of documents by the committees investigating the scandal, two key emails from this day are disclosed. The first, sent by assistant deputy finance minister Michelle Kovacevic, read in part: "There has been a lot of back and forth on a student package, as you well know and PMO has been weighing in on a version we shared with our Minister on Saturday." In addition to this, deputy minister of intergovernmental affairs and youth Christiane Fox wrote "I understand WE has been in touch with some of you (or your teams) on a proposal they have for social innovation, picking up from discussions they had with us pre-Covid. I am told they met with Ministers NG, Chagger and others to discuss this + a revised version of the service program. They reached out today as they are also working with DPMO and PMO."

On April 21, 2020 the Finance Department received a proposal from the WE Charity in which it outlined a volunteer program. Also on this day, the Finance Department decided to select a third-party to administer the contract, however it specified that no specific group had been chosen to run it.

On April 22, 2020, the Government of Canada announced a series of measures and future measures to be undertaken to address the impact of the ongoing COVID-19 pandemic on the student population of Canada. Among these, were plans for a program that would seek to compensate students for volunteer work; awarding up to a $5000 bursary for volunteer work.

On May 4, 2020, a final version of the proposal was submitted by WE Charity to Employment and Social Development Canada; this would ultimately become the Canada Student Service Grant program.

On May 5, 2020, Chagger submitted a recommendation to a special cabinet meeting that WE Charity should be selected to administer the program. This was also the date WE Charity began incurring eligible expenses and began work on the program.

On May 22, 2020 cabinet approved WE Charity as the official third-party administrator of the program.

On June 12, 2020, Marc Kielburger was recorded in a zoom call with youth leaders stating that the Prime Minister's Office had contacted WE Charity directly earlier in April to discuss the administration of the program. This statement was declared a fabrication by Kielburger himself, who later clarified "Speaking loosely and enthusiastically, I incorrectly referred to the Prime Minister's Office. In fact, the outreach came from unelected officials at Employment and Social Development Canada."

On June 23, 2020 a contract agreement is signed between the government and WE Charity Foundation. WE Charity Foundation is a separate entity from WE Charity.

On June 25, 2020, the Government of Canada announced the Canada Student Service Grant program through the Prime Minister's Office.

On June 30, 2020, the Government of Canada paid $30,000,000 to WE Charity Foundation to administer the program.

On July 3, 2020, the Ethics Commissioner announced an investigation into Trudeau and the decision to have WE Charity administer the program. It was later revealed that Trudeau's mother Margaret and brother Alexandre received $250,000 and $32,000, respectively, for speaking at WE events between 2016 and 2020. Additionally, Sophie Gregoire Trudeau, the wife of the Prime Minister, was also found to have been involved with the charity prior to the controversy. Two of the daughters of Minister of Finance Bill Morneau were found to have worked in unrelated work for the charity, one in a paid contract position, and the other as an unpaid volunteer; Morneau did not recuse himself from the cabinet decision for the contract. Opposition parties have called for a variety of actions including the release of documents related to the charity and for high-ranking Liberals to appear before Parliamentary committees; the Conservatives asked for an investigation by the RCMP.

On July 9, 2020, Bloc Québécois leader Yves-François Blanchet suggested that Prime Minister Trudeau should step aside "for a few months" during the ethics investigation, and "leave responsibilities to the Deputy Prime Minister" Chrystia Freeland. During a press conference in Ottawa on July 16, 2020, Freeland stated that the Prime Minister has her "complete confidence" and that "all of us, everyone in our government, everyone in cabinet, bears responsibility for this situation."

On July 16, 2020, Minister Chagger told a parliamentary committee that the Trudeau government had been willing to pay WE Charity more than $19.5 million if the Canada Student Service Grant program had been implemented, up to $43.5 million. Chagger went on to say that she was not directed by the prime minister or his staff in suggesting that WE Charity run the program, reiterating that it was a recommendation by the non-partisan civil service. In testimony delivered the same day, Rachel Wernick, the senior assistant deputy minister at Employment and Social Development Canada (ESDC), corroborated this claim saying that she had recommended WE Charity to administer the program, citing its far-reaching connections to youth and the scale and speed at which the program was to be delivered. Wernick further explained that she made her recommendation because the public service was overburdened with responsibilities pertaining to the COVID-19 pandemic, and that while other charities were consulted and considered, the program had to be started quickly, and an open bidding process would have taken months.

On July 21, 2020, Privy Council Clerk Ian Shugart backed up Wernick's statements supporting the Prime Minister's assertions, adding further that there was "no evidence" Trudeau had contact with WE Charity prior to the awarding of the contract, and that the public service and cabinet did not flag any potential conflicts of interest with the program. Shugart went on to say that the public service administering the program would make it less comprehensive than if it had been facilitated through the third-party delivery mechanism originally proposed. Shugart testified that there were misgivings regarding the speed at which government was moving on these programs. Shugart stated:
With respect to how we made decisions and so on, a lot it was virtually, as committees are experiencing. Often at all hours of the day and night given the amount of business and the extent of impacts of the pandemic, people were pressed, people were tired, some public servants were doing their work but knowing it was not being called on, and other public servants were under pretty unrelenting pressure to deliver, the same is true for ministers. With respect to the substance I would say that none of us have been happy with the speed at which analysis had to be undertaken, in fact, we conveyed informally, as did the former government during the financial crisis, to the office of the auditor general. That we anticipated that there would be mistakes.

On July 22, 2020, Minister of Finance Bill Morneau testified at the Standing Committee on Finance that he recently repaid WE Charity $41,366 for expenses incurred by WE for trips his family took to Kenya and Ecuador in 2017. Morneau said the repayment was done after "a thorough review" of his records, and that "this should've been something that we rectified sooner. It was absolutely an error. In looking through my records, I was completely surprised by the situation."

On July 27, 2020, media reports revealed that based on documents shared with the Finance Committee, while the $900 million figure originally reported was a maximum budget for the program, officials had drawn up a plan with WE Charity to spend only about half that amount. Additional documents supported the government's claims that the civil service had evaluated several other nonprofits, including Colleges and Institutes Canada, the United Way and Canadian Red Cross, before recommending WE Charity. Officials at some organizations however said they were never contacted to discuss the program despite indications that they had been. Peter Dinsdale, president and CEO of YMCA Canada, said that "[a]t no point did the government contact YMCA Canada about delivering that program." He added that his organization "absolutely" would have been capable of administering the program." Speaking to CTV News, Dinsdale stated that in light of the ongoing pandemic "It would have been tough given the state of YMCAs across the country, given the impact of COVID — really fighting for basic survival. In normal times, [this] 100 per cent would have been something we could have done." In addition to YMCA Canada, the Canadian Wildlife Federation, United Way, Chantiers Jeunesse, 4H Canada, and the Boys and Girls Clubs of Canada all said the government never contacted them about the CSSG — despite all of the organizations' names appearing on the government's list of groups it considered to deliver the program.

On July 28, 2020, Michelle Douglas, former chair of WE Charity's board, testified before the House of Commons finance committee. Douglas had resigned in March 2020, saying publicly that she did so due to "concerning developments" at the charity. She told the committee that during her tenure as chair, WE Charity's board made specific inquiries and were told that speakers were not being paid for appearing at We Day events. Douglas said she resigned because the organization refused to provide the board with financial documents or access to its chief financial officer, Victor Li, when the board was reviewing mass layoffs at the organization. Asked whether she concurred with the government's assertions that WE Charity was the only organization that could deliver the program at the intended scale and capacity, Douglas said that she could not speculate on that prospect because she had resigned months before the contract was awarded. Responding to concerns that WE Charity benefited from a close relationship with the federal Liberals, she went on to say that the board of directors considered WE Charity to be "non-partisan."

Craig and Marc Kielburger also testified before the finance committee on July 28. The brothers asserted that they did not stand to gain financially from running the program nor did they exploit their ties with the Trudeau family to secure the deal. Asked how "close" their relationship was with the Trudeaus, Craig Kielburger said that neither he nor his brother have ever "socialized" with the prime minister, his wife, his mother or his brother, going on to say that they only invited Sophie Gregoire Trudeau and Margaret Trudeau to take part in wellness programs because of their history of mental health advocacy. They added that elected officials of all political parties at all levels of government had participated in and sponsored WE Charity events, including former Alberta NDP premier Rachel Notley and Laureen Harper, wife of former Conservative prime minister Stephen Harper, who had hosted a reception for them at 24 Sussex Drive in 2013. The brothers also reiterated that it was a member of the civil service who had reached out to them to discuss the program and that they had mistakenly identified the contact as being from the prime minister's office. Craig Kielburger said that he regretted their team having answered the phone call from the civil service and that they did not foresee the escalating consequences that would arise as a result.

On July 30, 2020, Trudeau and his chief of staff, Katie Telford, testified before the finance committee. In his opening statement, Trudeau said that he was not aware that the public service had chosen WE Charity to administer the program until a briefing on May 8. He expected the preexisting Canada Student Service Corps to deliver it but was informed that they would not be able to do so at the scale and capacity required, in the rapid timeframe in which aid programs were being delivered during the pandemic. He again apologized for not recusing himself from cabinet discussions but reiterated that there was "absolutely no preferential treatment," nor direction or influence, from him or his office in selecting WE Charity to administer the Canada Student Service Grant. He went on further to say that the public service told him that the choice was between having WE Charity administer the program or having no program at all. The same day, Liberal MP Wayne Long released a public letter in which he criticized the government's decision-making process and called for full transparency and reform in the PMO and government more broadly to prevent "a systemic failure" in the future.

Also on July 30, 2020, the Public Service Alliance of Canada, a union representing federal workers, issued a statement condemning allegations made on July 21, that the public service was unable to administer the program. In its concluding remarks, the statement read "Finally—and let me conclude—if the government had either used existing programs or asked the public service to set up a new student work and payment plan, it would have avoided the conflict of interest issues that have come to light since the WE Charity announcement, and it would have been able to deliver both pay and work experience to students."

On July 31, 2020, the Government of Ontario announced that it would not be renewing an existing contract the province had with the WE Charity. Although the government did not specify which contract it was cancelling, the Charity was set to administer WE Schools, a $250,000 year-long education program. In a statement to media, the Ministry of Education stated that it "has been directed to not renew the contract with WE and to investigate the expenditures to date."

On August 11, 2020, WE Charity announced through a spokesman that it had returned $22 million of the $30 million it had received earlier on June 30, and was "waiting on the government to accept the remaining $8 million...".

On August 13, 2020, WE Charity registered to lobby the government with 18 individuals on record. As part of this agreement, WE Charity was also allowed to retroactively file its lobbying activities which showed it had engaged with numerous government departments 43 times since the beginning of 2020, with more than half of the communications occurring in or after April.

On August 17, 2020, Bill Morneau resigned as Finance Minister and Member of Parliament for Toronto Centre. This move was widely seen by analysts as a forced resignation designed to protect the Liberals from the unfolding scandal by pinning blame on Morneau.

On August 18, 2020, Prime Minister Trudeau suspended the functioning of the committees by asking the Governor General of Canada Julie Payette to prorogue Parliament until September 23 to present a new Speech from the Throne with an updated vision and priorities in light of the COVID-19 pandemic in Canada. Opposition leader, Andrew Scheer, characterized the prorogation as the government "hiding out" during political controversy. Conservative finance critic, Pierre Poilievre, tweeted that opposition members were demanding access to thousands of pages of documents concerning the controversy before Parliament is prorogued. Trudeau said that the government has released numerous documents that were previously requested by the Opposition, and that opposition members could review them while Parliament is prorogued. Many of these documents however were heavily redacted, and there were questions raised regarding whether what had been censored had been done so appropriately, according to House of Commons Law Clerk Philippe Dufresne, who stated that "public servants went too far in redacting the WE Charity documents released to MPs."

On August 19, 2020, the Canadian Press reported that documents released by the government show that federal public servants recommended the student service grant program be administered by WE Charity.  It also reported that documents suggest the government had "nudged" the public service in that direction.

On August 30, 2020 WE Charity, through its lawyer William McDowell, refused the opposition's requests for documents; the disclosure of which had been promised by the Kielburgers during their July 28 testimony. The reasons cited by WE Charity for not releasing the documents were "The committees ceased to exist with the prorogation of Parliament. There is no committee to receive the documents...when there is a new committee, our clients will be pleased to communicate with the clerk of the new committee regarding the production of documents."

On September 4, 2020 WE Charity Foundation, through a Twitter statement, announced it had repaid the remaining balance of the $30 million it had received on June 30, 2020.

On September 9, 2020, WE Charity announced that it was closing its operations in Canada due to political fallout from the controversy and the effects of COVID-19. The organization will establish an endowment to be overseen by a new board of governors.

On October 22, 2020, Queen's University announces that they are ending ties with the WE Charity. "While WE Charity is committed to completing their ongoing sustainable development projects around the world, we decided that it was the best decision to contribute to a new organization as WE Charity is planning to close operations in Canada," The Queen's WE Team has said in a post to their social media.

On October 29, 2020, the Ethics Commissioner discontinued his investigation into Bill Morneau's trips to Kenya and Ecuador that were funded by WE Charity, saying in a letter that he accepted Morneau's contention that he thought he had reimbursed the travel costs. The letter also indicated that Morneau and Trudeau remained under investigation for not recusing from cabinet discussions pertaining to the program. That same day, WE Charity issued a press release expressing satisfaction with the Ethics Commissioner's findings, in addition to announcing the publication of an independent forensic audit of the Canada Student Service Grant and WE Charity's finances conducted by several non-partisan analysts, including forensic accountant Al Rosen and Matt Torigian, the former Deputy Solicitor General for the province of Ontario. According to Torigian, "the CSSG Program was not pre-determined for WE Charity to implement; the government approached WE Charity through the proper channels, requesting that the charity submit a proposal." Parliamentary committees nevertheless continued to press the government on the matter.

On Friday February 26, 2021 the Canadian House of Commons Ethics Committee heard new testimony from a former WE Charity donor, Reed Cowan, saying that WE Charity removed a plaque honoring his dead child.  Video evidence shows that a new plaque tied to WE Charity board of director, David Stillman, had been put up to replace the plaque that carried the legacy of Wesley Cowan.

On February 28, 2021, NDP MP Charlie Angus called on the RCMP and CRA to open an investigation into potential financial fraud conducted by WE Charity. Angus called the testimony from donor Reed Cowan "explosive" and demanded a new level of transparency for all parties involved. After being pressured and harassed by WE Charity contacts, donor Reed Cowan issued a personal plea and demand for full transparency into alleged major international financial fraud by WE Charity.  Cowan called for the charity to return all funds raised in the name of his deceased son, Wesley, 4, who died in 2006 following an accident. "I demand that every penny paid to WE and Free the Children by the groups I brought there for what feels like a sham experience be immediately reimbursed. Every penny," he said in a video statement posted on YouTube on February 27, 2021.  Cowan said he has repeatedly asked for an accounting of where his money went and has never received that information from WE Charity.

On May 13, 2021, the Ethics Commissioner cleared Trudeau of involvement in the We Charity scandal; the Ethics Commissioner found that former Finance Minister Bill Morneau was in violation of the Conflict of Interest Act in relation to awarding We Charity the contract for the Canada Student Emergency Benefit.

See also 
 The White Saviors podcast by Canadaland about the event
 Federal aid during the COVID-19 pandemic in Canada
 List of Canadian political scandals and controversies
 Corruption in Canada

References 

2020 controversies
2020 in Canadian politics
2020 scandals
Corporate scandals
Corruption in Canada
Justin Trudeau controversies
Political controversies in Canada
Political history of Canada
Political scandals in Canada
Scandal